Vijaynagar State, known as Pol State before 1934 and also called Ghodadar for a short time, was a princely state under the Mahi Kantha Agency, Bombay Presidency in NE Gujarat during the British Raj. The capital of the state was in Vijaynagar taluka, Sabarkantha district. The state's last ruler signed the accession to the Indian Union on 10 June 1948.

History
Vijaynagar was ruled by bhil chiefs   
Pol state was founded in 1577. Between 1864 and 1877 it was renamed Vijayanagar after its new capital. The rulers of the state bore the title 'Rao'.

Rulers 
.... – 1720                Chandrasinhji                      (d. 1720)  
1720 – 1728                Kesarisinhji  
1728 – ....                Kasansinhji  
.... – ....                Makansinhji  
.... – ....                Hathisinhji  
.... – ....                Madhavsinhji  
.... – ....                Ajabsinhji  
.... – ....                Bhupatsinhji I 
.... – ....                Bhavansinhji 
.... – ....                Surajsinhji 
.... – ....                Vajesinhji 
.... – ....                Ratansinhji 
.... – ....                Abheysinhji 
.... – ....                Kiratsinhji 
.... – ....                Laxmansinhji 
.... – ....                Bharatsinhji 
.... – ....                Amarsinhji 
.... – 1852                Anandsinhji 
1852 – 1859                Pahadsinhji Gulabsinhji            (b. 1839 – d. 1859)
1859 – 1864                Navalsinhji                        (d. 1864)
23 Nov 1864 – 24 October 1889  Hamirsinhji I Gulabsinhji          (b. 1840 – d. 1889)
24 Oct 1889 – 1905         Prithisinhji Hamirsinhji           (b. 1872 – d. 1905)
Feb 1906 – 1913            Bhupatsinhji II Hamirsinhji        (b. 1885 – d. 1913)
1913 – 17 November 1914         Mohabatsinhji Bhupatsinhji         (b. 1883 – d. 1914) 
17 Nov 1914 – 1947         Hamirsinhji II Hindupatsinhji      (b. 1902/4 – d. 1986)
17 Nov 1914 – 1924         .... -Regent

See also
Mahi Kantha Agency
 Sabarkantha district

References

External links
Polo Monument and Vijaynagar Forest

Rajputs
Sabarkantha district
History of Gujarat
Rathores
1948 disestablishments in India